Peter Moore is a trombonist, who was born on 1 January 1996 in Belfast, Northern Ireland, and brought up in Stalybridge, Greater Manchester. He studied at Chethams School of Music in Manchester, leaving in 2014.

Moore was the winner of BBC Young Musician of the Year in May 2008, when he was only 12 years old. Moore  is the youngest winner of the competition to date, which is open to young persons aged 18 and under.

On 29 May 2014, it was announced that the London Symphony Orchestra had appointed Moore its co-principal trombonist, at 18 the youngest ever member of the orchestra.

From 2014-19 Peter was represented by Young Classical Artists Trust (YCAT).

Discography 
Edward Gregson's Trombone Concerto with BBC Concert Orchestra; Bramwell Tovey, conductor (Chandos CHAN 10627) - 2011

Life Force with James Baillieu, piano (Rubicon RCD1028) - 2018

References 

Living people
Irish classical musicians
Trombonists
1996 births
People from Stalybridge
21st-century trombonists